Antonie Plămădeală (17 November 1926 in Stolniceni, Lăpușna County, Bessarabia, Kingdom of Romania – 29 August 2005 in Sibiu) was a high-level hierarch of the Romanian Orthodox Church, the Orthodox Metropolitan of Transylvania (1982–2005).

Born Leonida Plămădeală, he received the name of Antonie when he was tonsured a monk in 1948.

He was friends with the Romanian philosopher Constantin Noica, and spoke at his funeral.

References

Romanian Orthodox metropolitan bishops
Honorary members of the Romanian Academy
People from Hîncești District
1926 births
2005 deaths